Ransom Seaborn is the debut novel by singer-songwriter and recording artist Bill Deasy.  The novel was published by Velluminous Press in 2006.

Reception
The Pittsburgh City Paper said while the characters in Ransom Seaborn were likable, the newspaper felt that Deasy added too many details in the book.

References

2006 American novels
2006 debut novels